Ruth Malcomson (April 16, 1906 – May 25, 1988) was Miss America in 1924, earning the title at age 18.

Malcomson, a native of Philadelphia, Pennsylvania was the amateur winner in the 1923 contest and returned to defeat incumbent Mary Campbell, who was seeking her third consecutive crown. At the time, being only a couple of years old, the beauty contest was sometimes still referred to as "The Atlantic City Pageant," with the winner called "The Golden Mermaid."

In a published article following the contest, Malcomson provided others with her 10 rules for beauty. Listed briefly, they are: 
 Rise early. 
 Eat a hearty breakfast. 
 Exercise. 
 No alcohol. 
 Smoking is detrimental. 
 Get outdoors.
 Eat a light lunch. 
 Eat a satisfying dinner. 
 Early to bed. 
 Sleep.

She is interred at the Arlington Cemetery in Drexel Hill, Pennsylvania.

References

External links

Photograph of Ruth Malcomson in 1924

1906 births
1988 deaths
Burials at Arlington Cemetery (Pennsylvania)
Miss America 1920s delegates
Miss America winners
People from Philadelphia
Place of death missing